Feitosa may refer to:

People
 Antonio Cleilson da Silva Feitosa (born 1987), Brazilian association football player
 Carlos Eduardo Albano Feitosa (born 1941), Brazilian volleyball player
 Francisco Erandir da Silva Feitosa (born 1982), Brazilian association football player
 Glaube Feitosa (born 1973), Brazilian former kickboxer and kyokushin full contact karate practitioner
 Sidny Feitosa dos Santos (born 1981), Brazilian association football player
 Tarcisio Feitosa da Silva, Brazilian environmental activist

Places
 Feitosa, Ponte de Lima, a parish in Ponte de Lima, Portugal
 Feitosa River, a river of Ceará, Brazil
 A neighborhood in Maceió, Brazil